Santiago Millas is a municipality located in La Maragatería, province of León, Castile and León, Spain. According to the 2004 census (INE), the municipality has a population of 335 inhabitants.

Villages 

 Barrio de Abajo
 Morales de Arcediano
 Oteruelo
 Piedralba
 Santiago Millas
 Valdespino de Somoza

References

Municipalities in the Province of León
Maragatería